The flights of the North American X-15, an experimental American spaceplane built by North American Aviation and operated by the United States Air Force and NASA, were conducted from 1959-1968. Twelve pilots flew three X-15 spaceplanes, flying record high-altitude flights, high-speed flights, and sub-orbital spaceflights.  Collectively, pilots and craft performed a total of 199 free flights after being carried aloft and then air launched from one of two modified B-52 mother ships.  The pilots and craft also performed twelve scheduled captive carry test flights and 125 aborted flights (frequently due either to technical problems or poor weather) in which the X-15 did not uncouple from its B-52 mother ship, for a grand total of 336 flights.  The X-15 program's flights generated data and flight experience which supported future development of aircraft, spacecraft, and human spaceflight.

Five principal aircraft were used during the X-15 program: three X-15 spaceplanes and two modified "nonstandard" NB-52 bomber carriers:
  56-6670,
  56-6671,
  56-6672,
  52-003 nicknamed The High and Mighty One,
  52-008 nicknamed The Challenger, later Balls 8.
Additionally, F-100, F-104 and F5D chase aircraft and C-130 and C-47 transports supported the program.

Pilots

Twelve pilots flew the X-15 over the course of its career.  Scott Crossfield and William Dana flew the X-15 on its first and last free flights, respectively.  Joseph Walker set the program's top two altitude records on its 90th and 91st free flights (347,800 and 354,200 feet, respectively), becoming the only pilot to fly past the Kármán line, the 100 kilometer, FAI-recognized boundary of outer space, during the program.  William Knight set the program's Mach (6.70) and speed (4,520 mph) records on its 188th free flight.  Neil Armstrong was the first pilot to fly the program's third plane, the X-15-3.  Following his participation in the program, Joe Engle commanded a future spaceplane, the Space Shuttle, on two missions. Robert Rushworth flew 34 free flights, the most in the program.  Forrest Petersen flew five, the fewest.  Robert White was the first person to fly the X-15 above 100,000 feet.  Milton Thompson piloted a series of typical flights during the middle of the program.  John McKay was injured in (and recovered from, returning to active flight status) a landing accident which damaged the X-15-2, leading to its refurbishment as the modified X-15A-2.  Michael Adams was killed in the program's 191st free flight.  Five pilots were Air Force personnel, five were NASA personnel, one (Crossfield) was employed by manufacturer North American, and one (Petersen) was a Navy pilot.

Over thirteen flights, eight pilots flew above 264,000 feet or 50 miles, thereby qualifying as astronauts according to the United States definition of the space border.  All five Air Force pilots flew above 50 miles and were awarded military astronaut wings contemporaneously with their achievements, including Adams, who received the distinction posthumously following the flight 191 disaster.  However the other three were NASA employees, and did not receive a comparable decoration at the time.  In 2004, the Federal Aviation Administration conferred its first-ever commercial astronaut wings on Mike Melvill and Brian Binnie, pilots of the commercial SpaceShipOne, another spaceplane with a flight profile comparable to the X-15's.  Following this in 2005, NASA retroactively awarded its civilian astronaut wings to Dana (then living), and to McKay and Walker (posthumously).  Eleven flights above 50 miles were made in the X-15-3, and two were made in the X-15-1.

Every X-15 pilot also flew as a program chase pilot at least once, supporting missions in which they were not flying as lead pilots.  Other chase pilots included future astronauts Michael Collins, Fred Haise and Jim McDivitt.

The two NB-52 mother ships were most frequently piloted by Fitz Fulton.  On one occasion Chuck Yeager, former pilot of the X-15's predecessor X-plane the X-1, the first crewed craft to break the sound barrier, assisted as NB-52 co-pilot for an aborted flight.

Flight numbering
Two conventions have been used to number the X-15's flights.  In one, the numbers 1 through 199 were used to chronologically denote the free flights made by any of the three spaceplanes.  For example, flight 1 (8 June 1959) was made by the X-15-1, flight 34 (7 March 1961) was made by the X-15-2, and flight 49 (5 April 1962) was made by the X-15-3.  This convention ignores captive and aborted flights.

The other convention was an official three-part flight designation number, described in a 1960 letter by NASA flight research director Paul Bikle, and split into three columns below.  The first part, a number—1, 2 or 3—would denote the involved X-15 plane.  The second part—a number, or "A", or "C"—would denote that individual X-15's chronological free flights; aborted flights were coded as "A", and scheduled captive carry test flights were coded as "C".  The third part, a number, would denote the total number of times to-date that the individual X-15 had been taken aloft by a carrier, whether resulting in a free flight or not.  For example, the X-15-1 was first taken aloft on scheduled captive test flight 1-C-1, next performed three aborted missions (1-A-2, 1-A-3, and 1-A-4), and then performed its first successful free flight on its fifth time taken aloft (1-1-5).

On 9 November 1962, flight 74 (2-31-52), the X-15-2 suffered a landing accident which damaged the craft and also injured its pilot, John McKay, who suffered crushed vertebrae and later returned to active flight status.  This presented North American with an opportunity not only to repair the plane, but to modify it—an idea which the Air Force and NASA were uninterested in while all three spaceplanes were in operational service, but agreed to once repairs were made necessary.  The result was a new, distinct airframe known as the X-15A-2 which returned to flight in June 1964, first on a scheduled captive check-out flight (15 June, 2-C-53) and an abort (23 June, 2-A-54) before finally making its return free flight on 25 June (flight 109, 2-32-55), all piloted by Robert Rushworth.  The flight numbering conventions made no distinction between the original craft and its modified iteration; it continued to be designated "2".

Neither convention accounted for which of the two NB-52 carriers took an X-15 aloft, given in a separate column below.  On free flights, the NB-52A carried the X-15 aloft 93 times, while the NB-52B carried it aloft 106 times.

List of flights

See also
 List of human spaceflights, 1961–1970
 List of Space Shuttle missions
 SpaceShipOne
 SpaceShipTwo

Notes

References

Further reading
 

Flight lists